"Crockett's Theme" is an instrumental song written for the hit NBC series Miami Vice. The surname Crockett refers to Don Johnson's character, James "Sonny" Crockett. The initial version of the theme first appeared in the episode "Calderone's Return: Part 1 – The Hit List", which aired on October 19, 1984. The song was composed by Jan Hammer and appears on the album Miami Vice II, the second volume of music from the television show. It also appeared on Jan Hammer's 1987 album Escape from Television.

Chart performance
The song was a hit in western Europe, reaching number one in Belgium and the Netherlands, for two and four weeks respectively. It peaked at number two in both Ireland and the United Kingdom.

Weekly charts

Year-end charts

Sales and certifications

Later uses
Between 1991 and 1994, the song was featured in a series of adverts for NatWest in the United Kingdom. It was subsequently re-released as a single in May 1991 in the United Kingdom as an A-side and B-side with Hammer's theme tune for Chancer. It reached number 47 in the UK Singles Chart.

In 2002, "Crockett's Theme" was featured in the soundtrack of  video game Grand Theft Auto: Vice City (as a part of Emotion 98.3 in-game radio station), itself heavily based on Miami Vice.

References

1984 songs
1986 singles
1980s instrumentals
Television drama theme songs
Miami Vice
Dutch Top 40 number-one singles
MCA Records singles